
Year 498 BC was a year of the pre-Julian Roman calendar. At the time, it was known as the Year of the Consulship of Siculus and Flavus (or, less frequently, year 256 Ab urbe condita). The denomination 498 BC for this year has been used since the early medieval period, when the Anno Domini calendar era became the prevalent method in Europe for naming years.

Events 
 By place 

 Greece 
 Alexander I succeeds his father Amyntas I as king of Macedonia.
 Athens and Eretria respond to the Ionian plea for help against Persia and send troops. An Athenian and Eretrian fleet transports Athenian troops to Ephesus. There they are joined by a force of Ionians and march upon Sardis, the capital of Artaphernes (the satrap of Lydia and brother to Darius I of Persia). Artaphernes, who has sent most of his troops to besiege Miletus, is taken by surprise. However, Artaphernes is able to retreat to the citadel and hold it. Although the Greeks are unable to take the citadel, they pillage the town and set fires that burn Sardis to the ground.
 Retreating to the coast, the Greek forces are met by the Persians under Artaphernes and defeated in the Battle of Ephesus.
 Kaunos and Caria, followed by Byzantium and towns in the Hellespont also revolt against the Persians. Cyprus also joins the rebellion, as Onesilus removes his pro-Persian brother, Gorgos, from the throne of Salamis.

 Sicily 
 After the assassination of Cleander, tyrant of Gela, power is transferred to his brother, Hippocrates, who subdues the Sicels and conquers the Chalcidian cities of Callipoli, Leontini, Naxos and Zancle (now known as Messina). He also captures the Syracusan city of Camarina, but is prevented from capturing Syracuse itself when Corinth and Corcyra interferes in the war.

 By topic 

 Literature 
 The earliest surviving of the Greek poets Pindar's epinikion (Pythian ode 10) is written.

Births 
Hippodamus of Miletus, Greek urban planner and polymath (d. 408 BC)

Deaths 
 Amyntas I, king of Macedonia (b. c. 540 BC)
 Cleander, tyrant of Gela

References